The 2020–21 Delaware State Hornets men's basketball team represented Delaware State University in the 2020–21 NCAA Division I men's basketball season. The Hornets, led by third-year head coach Eric Skeeters, played their home games at Memorial Hall in Dover, Delaware as members of the Mid-Eastern Athletic Conference. With the creation of divisions to cut down on travel due to the COVID-19 pandemic, they played in the Northern division. They finished the season 3–16, 1–11 in MEAC play to finish in fourth place in the Northern division. They failed to qualify for the MEAC tournament.

On April 1, 2021, the school fired Skeeters after three seasons at Delaware State. On June 3, the school named high school coach Stan Waterman the team's new head coach.

Previous season
The Hornets finished the 2019–20 season 6–26, 4–12 in MEAC play to finish in a tie for ninth place. As the No. 8 seed in the MEAC tournament, they beat Maryland Eastern Shore in the first round, before losing to North Carolina Central in the quarterfinals.

Roster

Schedule and results 

|-
!colspan=12 style=| Regular season

|-

Sources

References

Delaware State Hornets men's basketball seasons
Delaware State Hornets
Delaware State Hornets men's basketball
Delaware State Hornets men's basketball